Pinalia tenuiflora is a species of orchid.

References

tenuiflora